Thomas Lewis Atkinson (4 April 1817 in Salisbury – 1898) was a British reproductive engraver.

Further reading 
 Dyson, Anthony. "Atkinson, Thomas Lewis." In Grove Art Online. Oxford Art Online, (accessed February 24, 2012; subscription required).

External links 
 Entry for Thomas Lewis Atkinson on the Union List of Artist Names
 Works by Thomas Lewis Atkinson in the collection of the National Portrait Gallery
 Works by Thomas Lewis Atkinson in the collection of the British Museum

English engravers
People from Salisbury
1817 births
1889 deaths